Richard Robinson "Rob" Walker (born 1974/1975) was the Chief Deputy County Executive of Nassau County, New York from January 2010 until January 2018.  He was previously a Republican member of the New York State Assembly representing the 15th Assembly District, which includes parts of central Nassau County including Hicksville, Westbury and Syosset.

Political career
Walker had started out as a summer intern for then Nassau County Legislator Ed Mangano.  He moved on to become the assistant to Town of Oyster Bay Supervisor John Venditto and Director of Traffic Safety and Constituent Services. He then went on to become the Deputy Commissioner of Parks for the Town of Oyster Bay.  He was a major force behind the Save Environmental Assets Fund Committee.

Walker was then elected to the State Assembly. He was first elected after a special election held on May 24, 2005. He was then reelected in November 2006 and 2008. In the Assembly, he was the Vice Chair of the Steering Committee, Ranking Member of the Assembly Tourism, Parks, Arts & Sports Development Committee and the Assembly Standing Committees on Aging, Election Law, Energy, Labor, and member of the Assembly Sub Committee on Renewable Energy and the Joint Budget Conference Committee on Education. He served as the Chairman of the RemaiNY Young New Yorkers task force, as well as the Medicaid Fraud task force, Waste and Abuse task force, Safer Communities task force and successful schools task force.

When Ed Mangano decided to run against Tom Suozzi as Nassau County Executive in 2009, Walker acted as Mangano's Campaign Manager.  After Mangano won the election, he became Mangano's Chief Deputy County Executive.

In February 2018 Walker was arrested on charges of lying to the FBI, obstruction, and corruption. He put up his house in Hicksville and was released on $200,000 bail. He initially pleaded not guilty but ultimately pleaded guilty in May 2019. He originally had been due to be sentenced March 17, 2020, but due the pandemic, his sentencing was delayed to December 7, 2021 where he was sentenced to 18 months in federal prison. As part of his sentence, he was also require to pay a $5,500 fine, pay $5,000 in forfeiture, and perform up to 2,000 hours of community service. He was later reported to FCI Fort Dix on February 7, 2022 where he began his sentence.

Family
Walker is a lifelong resident of Hicksville, New York, where he resides with his wife Elizabeth.

His mother, Rose Marie Walker was councilwoman on the Town of Oyster Bay's Town Board, but left that position to take Ed Mangano's old seat in the Nassau County Legislature.

Election results
 May 2005 special election, NYS Assembly, 15th AD
{| class="Wikitable"
| Rob Walker (REP - CON) || ... || 2,040
|-
| Kathleen Magin Arreco (DEM) || ... || 471
|}

 November 2006 general election, NYS Assembly, 1st AD
{| class="Wikitable"
| Rob Walker (REP - IND - CON - WOR) || ... || 19,294
|-
| Matthew G. Pangburn (DEM) || ... || 13,368
|}

 November 2008 general election, NYS Assembly, 1st AD
{| class="Wikitable"
| Rob Walker (REP - IND - CON - WOR) || ... || 30,528
|-
| Stephanie G. Ovadia (DEM) || ... || 20,272
|}

References

External links
https://mobile.nytimes.com/2018/02/22/nyregion/nassau-county-corruption-walker.html?referer=https://www.google.com/

1970s births
Living people
Year of birth uncertain
Republican Party members of the New York State Assembly